Hammatoderus pollinosus is a species of beetle in the family Cerambycidae. It was described by Henry Walter Bates in 1880. It is known from Costa Rica.

References

Hammatoderus
Beetles described in 1880